Common Rider was an American ska punk band, formed in 1999 by Jesse Michaels (guitar, vocals), Mass Giorgini (bass) and Dan Lumley (drums). The band's name is taken from a Japanese TV show, Kamen Rider (Kamen Rider means "Masked Rider" in Japanese.)

History 
Michaels was formerly the lead vocalist for Operation Ivy, 1987 to 1989.

The band released two full-length albums and one EP. Last Wave Rockers was released in 1999 on Lookout! Records. Thief In a Sleeping Town EP was also released on Lookout! Records in 2001 and featured Billie Joe Armstrong of Green Day (guitar/backing vocals). The band released This Is Unity Music on Hopeless Records in 2002. The band toured the US extensively the same year, including the 2002 Plea For Peace tour, sponsored by Asian Man Records. On the tour, Phillip Hill (from Teen Idols and also a major contributor on the album This is Unity Music) played guitar, along with Joe Mizzi. The band's last release was a split with Against All Authority in April 2005, containing outtakes from 2002's This Is Unity Music.

The band broke up in 2003. In 2005, bassist and producer Mass Giorgini went to Australia to record an album for Brisbane-based reggae/ska outfit Scarred Hope; he has also performed with Dan Lumley in the band Squirtgun. Michaels has continued to perform sporadically and to produce art. In late 2008, Michaels emerged with a new band named Classics of Love, after the Common Rider song.

Discography

Albums and EPs

Compilations

References 

American ska punk musical groups
Punk rock groups from California
Hopeless Records artists